Khalil Kord (also Romanized as Khalīl Kord; also known as Khalīl Gerd) is a village in Salehabad Rural District, Salehabad District, Bahar County, Hamadan Province, Iran. At the 2006 census, its population was 730, in 196 families.

References 

Populated places in Bahar County